John Holer (August 15, 1935 – June 23, 2018), born Ivan Holerjem, was a Slovenian-Canadian businessman. An immigrant to Canada, Holer is most notable for founding Marineland of Canada in Niagara Falls, Ontario, Canada. He founded the park in the early 1960s and managed it until his death in 2018.

Early life
Holer was born in Žice, a village in Slovenia, then part of Yugoslavia. His family were farmers and vintners in a wine region. Holer himself studied the chemistry of wine in technical school. After the Second World War, when Communists expropriated part of the family farm, Holer escaped across the border into Graz, Austria. He worked at a winery before travelling to Germany, where he gained employment with Circus Krone and learned to train animals.

Move to Canada and career
Holer immigrated to Canada in 1957, settling in the Niagara area. Holer worked at various jobs, including at the Canada Steamship Lines dry dock at Welland, Ontario. Using some of the proceeds, Holer, with a partner, bought part of the Harry Oakes estate in Niagara Falls on which to build an animal attraction for Niagara tourists, doing some of the building himself. The "Marine Wonderland and Animal Farm" opened in 1961. Holer had welded two large steel tanks together and brought in three sea lions and charged one quarter for admission and another to feed the animals. The attraction also featured an underwater show featuring two female swimmers.

Holer owned and supervised Marineland of Canada, as it was later named, until his death in 2018. Holer was known to drive around the park in his truck, personally supervising. Marineland expanded in the 1970s and 1980s, adding marine mammals (orcas, belugas and dolphins ), land animals and large rides, including a large roller coaster and tower drop ride. The park's keeping of marine mammals attracted the attention of animal activists, opposed to the keeping of the animals in captivity, who would protest outside the park's gates, with the death of beluga whale in 1999 leading to Holer receiving arson threats. In 2004, Holer purchased a trailer park neighboring Marineland, and in 2009 evicted all 47 families living there. In the 2010s, the park was investigated several times for animal cruelty. Through it all, Holer insisted that his animals were well taken care of, and initiated lawsuits against former employees, activists and the Ontario Society for the Prevention of Cruelty to Animals.

Death
Holer died on June 23, 2018, aged 82. He was praised as an "immigrant success story" by Senator Don Plett (Manitoba). Holer had been seriously ill for five months, and died at his home on Chippawa Parkway.

Personal life
Holer was survived by his wife of 46 years, Marie and son Peter. Another son, John Mark Jr., died in 2013. He was interred at Fairview Cemetery.

Marineland is now run by 'Holer Family Amusements', a company founded by his family after he died.

References

1935 births
2018 deaths
Slovenian emigrants to Canada